St Oswald's Church is a Church of England parish church in Sowerby, North Yorkshire, England. It is named after Oswald of Northumbria.

History
The earliest church at Sowerby of which any part remains appears to have been built about 1140. The fine south doorway was probably built in the eleventh century and most of the stone work in the south wall of the nave is of medieval date. The tower, which contains the remains of the Norman church, was built in the fifteenth century with a hagioscope through which the altar is seen. In 1842, the church was restored and enlarged in nineteenth century Norman style. In 1883, further restoration and repair included the erection of an open Lantern of woodwork surmounted by a slated spire above the chancel crossing. In 1902, the north wall was taken down and made into an arcade and a spacious north aisle built. In the 1980s, re-ordering of the church took place including adding a free-standing altar to allow more intimate congregational worship. The church was Grade II* listed in 1966.

The churchyard contains two Commonwealth war graves, of a Royal Air Force boy airman of the First World War and a Royal Armoured Corps soldier of the Second World War.

Gallery

References

External links

St Oswald's Parish Church, Sowerby

Sowerby, St Oswald's Church
Diocese of York
Grade II* listed churches in North Yorkshire